The following is a list of films produced in the Tamil film industry in India in 1951, in alphabetical order.

1951

References

Films, Tamil
Lists of 1951 films by country or language
1951
1950s Tamil-language films